The Southgate Ladies Open was a golf tournament on the LPGA Tour from 1969 to 1975. It was played at the Leawood South Country Club in Leawood, Kansas.

Winners
Southgate Open
1975 Kathy Whitworth

Southgate Ladies Open
1974 Jane Blalock and Sue Roberts (tie)
1973 Kathy Whitworth
1972 Kathy Whitworth

Southgate Open
1971 Pam Barnett

Southgate Ladies Open
1970 Kathy Ahern
1969 Carol Mann

References

Former LPGA Tour events
Golf in Kansas
Sports in the Kansas City metropolitan area
Recurring sporting events established in 1969
Recurring events disestablished in 1975
1969 establishments in Kansas
1975 disestablishments in Kansas
History of women in Kansas